Selo imeni Karla Marksa is a rural locality (a selo) in Bolshebredikhinsky Selsoviet, Kizlyarsky District, Republic of Dagestan, Russia. The population was 2,189 as of 2010. There are 13 streets.

Geography 
It is located 12 km northeast of Kizlyar (the district's administrative centre) by road, on the left bank of the Stary Terek River. Maloye Kozyrevskoye and Sadovoye are the nearest rural localities.

Nationalities 
Dargins, Avars, Russians, Laks, Rutuls and Lezgins live there.

References 

Rural localities in Kizlyarsky District